Alexandre Nicolas Philippe Edouard Mourreau (born June 26, 1986, Geneva) is a Swiss-Italian businessman and event organizer. He is the director and co-founder of Future Photography, an international media company, and director of Cars & Coffee Geneva, a yearly event for supercar and hypercar owners.

Mourreau has collaborated with several automobile companies, including Bugatti, Lamborghini, Rolls-Royce, and Aston Martin.

Early life and education
Mourreau was born on June 26, 1986, in Geneva, Switzerland, to his parents, Serge Mourreau and Caterina Bossi. His father was an architect and decorator and also worked in real estate.

Mourreau pursued his primary education at a boarding school. He obtained his high school diploma from Collège Alpin International Beau Soleil in 2005 and went to the IFM University in Geneva to earn a bachelor's degree in business administration. He also finished an acting course at Italy's Beatrice Bracco Acting Training.

Career
Mourreau began his career by creating an event company with friends and hosted events in Switzerland, where he invited guests and celebrities. He later left this company due to personal reasons. He entered the real estate industry before establishing Future Photography in 2012, an international media company that provides videography and photography services.

Mourreau founded AM EVENTS in 2018, a company that plans and oversees events. Later, he became the director of a yearly event for supercar and hypercar owners, Cars & Coffee Geneva. Mourreau collaborated with many auto companies, like Lamborghini, Rolls-Royce, and Aston Martin, as well as communities, like art galleries, while planning events. Along with other celebrities and stars, he has collaborated with Misha Marvin, Siboy, Rick Ross, and Cahiips.

Mourreau purchased his first Lamborghini at the Garage Roland Affolter – Lamborghini Porrentruy. Later on, he collaborated and planned an event with an art gallery where they called a graffiti artist, Alec Monopoly, who painted and tagged his Lamborghini Aventador SVJ.

In 2022, he added a Bugatti Chiron Tourbillon Timepiece to his collection of watches.

Later, he collaborated with well-known automakers, including Bugatti, Aston Martin, Lamborghini, and Rolls-Royce. In addition, Mourreau is also one of the 500 owners of a Bugatti Chiron in the world.

References

External links
Future Photography
Instagram

1986 births
Living people
Businesspeople from Geneva
Collège Alpin International Beau Soleil alumni